The 2010 ICC Awards were held on 6 October 2010 in Bangalore, India in association with the Federation of International Cricketers' Associations (FICA).

The ICC had been hosting ICC Awards since 2004, which were now into their seventh year. Previous events were held in London (2004), Sydney (2005), Mumbai (2006), Johannesburg (2007, 2009) and Dubai (2008).

The ICC awards the Sir Garfield Sobers Trophy to the Cricketer of the Year, which is considered to be the most prestigious award in world cricket.

Selection Committee
Chaired by ICC Cricket Hall of Famer Clive Lloyd, the ICC Selection Committee was charged with two main tasks. Using their experience, knowledge and appreciation of the game, they selected the ICC World XI Teams and provided a long list of nominations to the 25 members of the voting academy to cast their votes in the individual player award categories.

Selection Committee members:

 Clive Lloyd (chairman)
 Angus Fraser
 Duncan Fletcher
 Matthew Hayden
 Ravi Shastri

Award categories and winners

Cricketer of the Year

 Sachin Tendulkar

Test Player of the Year

 Virender Sehwag

ODI Player of the Year

 AB de Villiers

Twenty20 International Performance of the Year
 Brendon McCullum, for scoring 116 not out off 56 deliveries against Australia at Lancaster Park in Christchurch on 28 February 2010

Emerging Player of the Year

 Steven Finn

Associate Player of the Year
 Ryan ten Doeschate

Umpire of the Year

 Aleem Dar

Women's Cricketer of the Year

 Shelley Nitschke

Spirit of Cricket

LG People's Choice Award
 Sachin Tendulkar

ICC World XI Teams

ICC Test Team of the Year

MS Dhoni was selected as both captain and wicket-keeper of the Test Team of the Year. Other players are:

 Virender Sehwag
 Simon Katich
 Sachin Tendulkar
 Hashim Amla
 Kumar Sangakkara
 Jacques Kallis
 MS Dhoni
 Graeme Swann
 James Anderson
 Dale Steyn
 Doug Bollinger

ICC ODI Team of the Year

Ricky Ponting was selected as the captain of the ODI Team of the Year, with MS Dhoni also selected as the wicket-keeper. Other players are:

 Sachin Tendulkar
 Shane Watson
 Michael Hussey
 AB de Villiers
 Paul Collingwood
 Ricky Ponting
 MS Dhoni
 Daniel Vettori
 Stuart Broad
 Doug Bollinger
 Ryan Harris

Short lists
The following are the short lists for the 2010 LG ICC Awards:

Cricketer of the Year
 Hashim Amla
 Virender Sehwag
 Graeme Swann
 Sachin Tendulkar

Test Player of the Year
 Hashim Amla
 Virender Sehwag
 Dale Steyn
 Sachin Tendulkar

ODI Player of the Year
 Ryan Harris
 Sachin Tendulkar
 AB de Villiers
 Shane Watson

Twenty20 International Performance of the Year
 Michael Hussey
 Mahela Jayawardene
 Brendon McCullum
 Ryan McLaren

Emerging Player of the Year
 Umar Akmal
 Steven Finn
 Angelo Mathews
 Tim Paine

Associate Player of the Year
 Ryan ten Doeschate
 Trent Johnston
 Kevin O'Brien
 Mohammad Shahzad

Umpire of the Year
 Aleem Dar
 Steve Davis
 Tony Hill
 Simon Taufel

Women's Cricketer of the Year
 Katherine Brunt
 Shelley Nitschke
 Ellyse Perry
 Stafanie Taylor

Spirit of Cricket
 India
 New Zealand

LG People's Choice Award
 Michael Hussey
 Mahela Jayawardene
 Andrew Strauss
 Sachin Tendulkar
 AB de Villiers

Nominations
The following are the nominations for the 2010 LG ICC Awards, initially announced on 18 August 2010:

Cricketer of the Year
 Hashim Amla
 Doug Bollinger
 Michael Clarke
 MS Dhoni
 Ryan Harris
 Mitchell Johnson
 Jacques Kallis
 Morné Morkel
 Ricky Ponting
 Kumar Sangakkara
 Virender Sehwag
 Dale Steyn
 Graeme Swann
 Sachin Tendulkar
 Daniel Vettori
 AB de Villiers
 Shane Watson

Test Player of the Year
 Hashim Amla
 James Anderson
 Mohammad Asif
 Doug Bollinger
 MS Dhoni
 Tamim Iqbal
 Mahela Jayawardene
 Jacques Kallis
 Simon Katich
 Kumar Sangakkara
 Thilan Samaraweera
 Virender Sehwag
 Dale Steyn
 Graeme Swann
 Sachin Tendulkar
 Shane Watson

ODI Player of the Year
 Hashim Amla
 Doug Bollinger
 MS Dhoni
 Tillakaratne Dilshan
 Ryan Harris
 Michael Hussey
 Jacques Kallis
 Ricky Ponting
 Virender Sehwag
 Sachin Tendulkar
 Daniel Vettori
 AB de Villiers
 Shane Watson
 Cameron White

Twenty20 International Performance of the Year
 Sulieman Benn
 Deandra Dottin
 Chris Gayle
 Michael Hussey
 Mahela Jayawardene
 Nuwan Kulasekara
 Brendon McCullum
 Ryan McLaren
 Eoin Morgan
 Nehemiah Odhiambo
 Ellyse Perry
 Suresh Raina
 Darren Sammy

Emerging Player of the Year
 Mohammad Amir
 Umar Akmal
 Tim Bresnan
 Steven Finn
 Shafiul Islam
 Ravindra Jadeja
 Virat Kohli
 Angelo Mathews
 Eoin Morgan
 Pragyan Ojha
 Tim Paine
 Wayne Parnell
 Kemar Roach
 Steve Smith
 Paul Stirling
 David Warner

Associate Player of the Year
 Ashish Bagai
 Richie Berrington
 Mudassar Bukhari
 Tom Cooper
 Ryan ten Doeschate
 Trent Johnston
 Kevin O'Brien
 Mohammad Shahzad
 Samiullah Shenwari
 Paul Stirling

Umpire of the Year
 Billy Bowden
 Aleem Dar
 Steve Davis
 Asoka de Silva
 Billy Doctrove
 Marais Erasmus
 Ian Gould
 Tony Hill
 Daryl Harper
 Rudi Koertzen
 Asad Rauf
 Simon Taufel
 Rod Tucker

Women's Cricketer of the Year
 Suzie Bates
 Nicola Browne
 Katherine Brunt
 Sophie Devine
 Jhulan Goswami
 Lydia Greenway
 Sarah McGlashan
 Shelley Nitschke
 Ellyse Perry
 Leah Poulton
 Mithali Raj
 Gouher Sultana
 Stafanie Taylor

See also

 International Cricket Council
 ICC Awards
 Sir Garfield Sobers Trophy (Cricketer of the Year)
 ICC Test Player of the Year
 ICC ODI Player of the Year
 David Shepherd Trophy (Umpire of the Year)
 ICC Women's Cricketer of the Year
 ICC Test Team of the Year
 ICC ODI Team of the Year

References

External links
Official website of the ICC

International Cricket Council awards and rankings
Crick
2010 in cricket